Fisera perplexata, the light-tan crest-moth, is a moth of the family Geometridae first described by Francis Walker in 1860. It is found in Australia.

Adults have brown forewings, each with a central dark spot. The summer form has a submarginal row of smaller dark dots. The winter form has a pale marginal area marked by a dark cusped submarginal line.

External links
Australian Faunal Directory

Moths of Australia
Geometridae
Moths described in 1860